The 2014 Critérium International, was the 83rd edition of the Critérium International cycling stage race. It took place on the island of Corsica, around the city of Porto Vecchio. As the previous two editions, the race consisted of three stages, with the first two held on the same day. The second stage was a short individual time trial.

Mathias Frank was second in the overall classification and won both the Points and the King of the Mountains classifications, while 's Rafał Majka finished ahead of the Young Rider classification. Suisse team  won the Teams classification.

Schedule

Teams
A total of 15 teams took part in the race:

ProTeams

 
 
 
 
 
 
 
 

Professional Continental Teams

 
 
 
 
 

Continental Teams

Stages

Stage 1
29 March 2014 — Porto-Vecchio to Porto-Vecchio,

Stage 2
29 March 2014 — Porto-Vecchio, individual time trial (ITT)

Stage 3
30 March 2014 — Porto-Vecchio to Col de l'Ospedale,

Classification leadership table

References

External links

Criterium International
Criterium International
Critérium International